Stefan A. F. Bon is a Professor of Chemical Engineering in the department of Chemistry at the University of Warwick, United Kingdom. His research considers polymer-based colloids. He is a Fellow of the International Union of Pure and Applied Chemistry, an elected member of the International Polymer Colloids Group (IPCG),  and member of the physical Newton international fellowship committee, and served as the Royal Society of Chemistry Outreach Lecturer in 2015-2016.

Academic career 
Bon studied chemical engineering at the Eindhoven University of Technology (TUe) in the Netherlands, obtaining his integrated undergraduate and MSc in Chemical Engineering (ir.) in 1993. He continued to specialize in the area of polymer and colloid science, with research in nitroxide-mediated reversible-deactivation radical polymerization (RDRP), and obtained his PhD in 1998 in polymer chemistry under the supervision of Anton L. German. He worked as a postdoctoral research assistant with David M. Haddleton at the University of Warwick from spring 1998, and was appointed as Unilever Lecturer in polymer chemistry in January 2001.He continues his career at the University of Warwick where he is a professor in polymer and colloid chemical engineering.

Research 
Bon pioneered nitroxide-mediated reversible-deactiviation radical emulsion polymerization. His current research takes a chemical engineering and soft matter physics approach to polymer and colloidal systems. Research themes in the BonLab are: colloid and polymer science for the environment, a mechanistic understanding of polymer and colloid synthesis and physical/mechanical behaviour, out-of-equilibrium active matter, colloidal materials for a circular economy, and colloids at interfaces: adhesion and film formation. Bon works with a number of industrial partners.

Alongside his academic research, Bon is chair of the Polymer Club, an industrial consortium aimed at promoting research and education in polymer and colloid science. He is the founder and host of the 2020 COVID19 international polymer colloids group webinar series. He is also a member of the physical Newton international fellowship committee.

Honours and awards 

 Elected Fellow of the International Union of Pure and Applied Chemistry
Royal Society of Chemistry Materials Division Outreach Lecturer (2015-2016)
Winner of a Warwick Award for Teaching Excellence [WATE] (2021).

Selected publications

 Samuel R. Wilson-Whitford, Ross W. Jaggers, Brooke W. Longbottom, Matt K. Donald, Guy J. Clarkson, and Stefan A. F. Bon (22 January 2021). "Textured Microcapsules through Crystallization". ACS Applied Materials and Interfaces. 13 (4): 5887-5894. doi:10.1021/acsami.0c22378

References 

Chemical engineering academics
Eindhoven University of Technology alumni
21st-century Dutch scientists
Academics of the University of Warwick
British LGBT scientists
Year of birth missing (living people)
Living people